Yairo Armando Glaize Yau (born 7 September 1989) is a Panamanian footballer who currently plays as a winger for Quiché FC in Guatemala

Career

Early career
In 2009, at the age of 19, Yau began his senior career at Panamanian club Alianza before moving to Sporting San Miguelito a year later where he made 17 appearances before being loaned out to Deportivo Cali in 2011 and Australian club Sydney FC in 2012. The move to Sydney FC is Yau's first move outside of Central or South America so far in his short career.

Club career
On July 11, 2012, it was announced that he had joined Sydney FC on a one year loan deal from Panamanian club Sporting San Miguelito with the option to make the move permanent throughout the season.
After a solid first season which yielded 6 goals in 18 games, Sydney FC announced that they would be extending the loan for an additional year. On 7 January 2014, Sydney FC announced that they would be releasing Yau from the remaining months of his loan deal to allow him to undergo treatment for compartment syndrome in his legs.

He was released by Sporting in summer 2015 and Yau moved to Mexico to play for second division side Coras de Tepic.

In January 2020 Yau moved to Guatemala and joined Quiché FC.

International career
Yau has represented Panama at U21, U23 and senior level in recent years. He made one appearance for the U21 team in the 2010 CAC Games and also made 5 appearances overall for Panama at U23 level, scoring 1 goal in their CONCACAF Under 23 Olympic Qualifying campaign.

On 8 September 2010 he made his senior international debut for Panama in a match against Trinidad and Tobago coming of the bench to replace Luis Rentería in the 67' minute of the game. In May 2012 he scored his first goal for Panama in a match against Guyana national football team.

International goals

Under-23

Full international

Career statistics

References

External links
 
 
 

1989 births
Living people
Sportspeople from Panama City
Association football wingers
Panamanian footballers
Panamanian expatriate footballers
Panama international footballers
Alianza F.C. footballers
Sporting San Miguelito players
Deportivo Cali footballers
Sydney FC players
Coras de Nayarit F.C. footballers
San Francisco F.C. players
C.S. Cartaginés players
Costa del Este F.C. players
Categoría Primera A players
A-League Men players
Liga Panameña de Fútbol players
Ascenso MX players
Liga FPD players
Panamanian expatriate sportspeople in Colombia
Panamanian expatriate sportspeople in Australia
Panamanian expatriate sportspeople in Mexico
Panamanian expatriate sportspeople in Costa Rica
Panamanian expatriate sportspeople in Guatemala
Expatriate footballers in Colombia
Expatriate soccer players in Australia
Expatriate footballers in Mexico
Expatriate footballers in Costa Rica
Expatriate footballers in Guatemala